Trudi Schoop (October 9, 1904 – July 14, 1999) was a Swiss dancer who pioneered the treatment of mental illness with dance therapy.

Life and work
Born in Switzerland, the daughter of the editor of the Swiss newspaper Neue Zürcher Zeitung, Her younger sister was Hedi Schoop. Schoop was mostly self-taught, though she did study some ballet and modern dance after she was an established performer. She performed throughout the 1930s and made several tours of the United States, arranged by the impresario Sol Hurok. Schoop, the performer, was often referred to as a female Charlie Chaplin. She often toured often under the moniker, "Trudi Schoop and her Dancing Comedians."

Schoop stayed in Switzerland during World War II, and often performed in anti-Fascist cabaret shows. She resumed touring after the war, but disbanded her dance company in 1947 and moved to Los Angeles, California to undertake an exploration of dance as therapy for schizophrenic patients.

Among the several California medical institutions where Schoop worked was the Camarillo State Mental Hospital, where she was recommended as a therapist by UCLA neuropsychiatrists who had reviewed her theories. Schoop developed what she called body-ego technique, which used movement to help draw patients out of isolation and help them to respond to, rather than shrink from, human contact.

Schoop impacted countless people and is known as one of the founders of dance/movement therapy, based on the dance/movement therapy created by C.G:Jung in 1916. In Los Angeles she worked together with  Tina Keller-Jenny.  Many people who studied with her mentioned her sense of humor, warmth, and love.

She died in Van Nuys, California. Her Ashes were scattered at sea, off the coast of Orange County, California

References

Further reading
 Dance magazine, article, "Trudi's Here Again", (mime Trudi Schoop), February 1938.
 Levy, Fran.  1988. "Trudi Schoop, Dance Movement Therapy: A Healing Art."Reston, Virginia: The American Alliance for Health, Physical Education and Recreation.
 Mitchell, Peggy and Schoop, Trudi, "Won't You Join the Dance: A Dancer's Essay into the Treatment of Psychosis", National Press Books, /9780874842296/0-87484-229-8.
 Young, Therese Adams. "From Dance Mime to Dance Therapy", Thesis (M.A.)--Texas Woman's University, 1986. Microfiche.|bEugene :|cMicroform Publications, College of Human Development and Performance, University of Oregon, |d1988.|e2 microfiches : negative.

External links
Guide to the Collection on Trudi Schoop. Special Collections and Archives, The UC Irvine Libraries, Irvine, California.

1904 births
1999 deaths
Swiss female dancers
Dance therapists
Entertainers from Zürich